Imad Idriss (born 22 June 1955) is a Syrian boxer. He competed in the men's light middleweight event at the 1980 Summer Olympics.

References

1955 births
Living people
Syrian male boxers
Olympic boxers of Syria
Boxers at the 1980 Summer Olympics
Place of birth missing (living people)
Asian Games medalists in boxing
Boxers at the 1982 Asian Games
Asian Games silver medalists for Syria
Medalists at the 1982 Asian Games
Light-middleweight boxers
20th-century Syrian people